Eastwood Community Football Club is a football club based in Eastwood, Nottinghamshire, England. The club is a FA Charter Standard Club affiliated to the Nottinghamshire County Football Association. The club's nickname is the Red Badgers.

History
The club was formed in 2014 following the folding of Eastwood Town. They joined the South Division of the Central Midlands League and entered the FA Vase for the first time a year later. After finishing as runners-up in the South Division in 2016–17, the club won the division the following season and were promoted to the East Midlands Counties League.

In 2021 Eastwood were promoted to the Premier Division North of the United Counties League based on their results in the abandoned 2019–20 and 2020–21 seasons.

Ground
The club play their home games at Coronation Park. This was also the home ground for Eastwood Town.

Honours
Central Midlands League
South Division champions 2017–18

Records
Best FA Vase performance: Fourth round, 2018–19

References

External links
Official website

Football clubs in England
Football clubs in Nottinghamshire
Association football clubs established in 2014
2014 establishments in England
Eastwood, Nottinghamshire
Central Midlands Football League
East Midlands Counties Football League
United Counties League